The Congregational Christian Church of American Samoa (CCCAS) or the "Ekalesia Faapotopotoga Kerisiano i Amerika Samoa" (EFKAS) is a theologically Calvinist and congregational denomination in American Samoa.

It was established in 1980 with Galea'i Peni Poumele as its first Chairman. Poumele was instrumental in the establishment of the church in the early 1980s.

Background and history

The church was established by the missionaries of the London Missionary Society in the 1830s. American Samoa had been a naval dependency of the United States, in 1950 it became an American dependent civil territory. The way opened for a gradual emergence of the American Samoan Church from the Congregational Christian Churches in the USA. Later when the United Church of Christ was formed the United Church Board of Foreign Missions supported the churches in Samoa. Now Samoan Congregational Christian congregations were established in the United States and in New Zealand, Australia, Hawaii besides American Samoa. In 1980 the Congregational Christian Church in American Samoa was established. The church maintains the Kanana Fou Theological Seminary, the Kanana Fou High School, and the Kanana Fou Elementary School.

Statistics
In 2004 the Congregational Christian Church of American Samoa had 90,000 members, 120 congregations and 380 house fellowships in the world. The official languages are English and Samoan.
Today there are more than 60 congregation of the Samoan Congregational Church in California, Oregon, Washington, Alaska and Hawaii many of them are related to the UCC through Conferences and regional Associations.

Interchurch organisations
A member of the World Communion of Reformed Churches, the World Council of Churches, Pacific Conference of Churches and maintains partnership with the United Church of Christ and the Congregational Christian Church in Samoa.

The denominational headquarters located in Pago Pago.

References

External links
Official website of the Congregational Christian Church in American Samoa

Christianity in American Samoa
Congregational denominations established in the 20th century
Members of the World Communion of Reformed Churches
Reformed denominations in Oceania
Christian organizations established in 1980
Religious organizations based in American Samoa